Urban Renewal is a Tower of Power album recorded in 1974 and released in 1975.  It's also the last album to feature lead singer Lenny Williams, who would leave to continue a successful solo career.  Plus drummer David Garibaldi left temporarily, although he does appear on the song "Willing To Learn" which was the first single released on the album.  David Bartlett takes the reins as drummer for this album.  Also conga player Brent Byars left after the previous album Back to Oakland, with Carter Collins taking over for him on this album.

Track listing
 "Only So Much Oil in the Ground" (Stephen "Doc" Kupka, Emilio Castillo) - 3:46
 "Come Back, Baby" (Bruce Conte, Lenny Williams) - 3:21
 "It's Not the Crime" (Stephen "Doc" Kupka, Emilio Castillo) - 1:45
 "I Won't Leave Unless You Want Me To" (Stephen "Doc" Kupka, Emilio Castillo, Greg Adams) - 3:28
 "Maybe It'll Rub Off" (Stephen "Doc" Kupka, Emilio Castillo, Chester D. Thompson) - 3:15
 "(To Say the Least) You're the Most" (Johnny "Guitar" Watson) - 2:28
 "Willing to Learn" (Emilio Castillo, Stephen "Doc" Kupka) - 4:35
 "Give Me the Proof" (David Bartlett) - 2:35
 "It Can Never Be the Same" (Bruce Conte, Stephen "Doc" Kupka, Emilio Castillo) - 4:43
 "I Believe in Myself" (Emilio Castillo, Stephen "Doc" Kupka) - 2:00
 "Walkin' Up Hip Street" (Chester D. Thompson) - 5:50

Production 
 Emilio Castillo – producer 
 Tower of Power – producers
 Alan Chinowsky – engineer 
 Tom Flye – engineer 
 Chris Morris – assistant engineer 
 Kurt Kinzel – assistant engineer 
 Bruce Steinberg – album design, liner photography 
 Recorded and Mixed at Record Plant (Sausalito, California).

Personnel 
Tower of Power
 Lenny Williams – lead vocals (1, 2, 4-10)
 Chester D. Thompson – acoustic piano, clavinet, organ, ARP synthesizer, bass pedals, backing vocals (1, 4, 5, 7, 8), arrangements (5, 11)
 Bruce Conte – guitars, backing vocals (1, 4, 5, 7, 8)
 Francis Rocco Prestia – bass guitar
 David Bartlett – drums (1-6, 8-11), backing vocals (8)
 Lenny Pickett – clarinet, bass clarinet, alto flute, alto saxophone, soprano saxophone, 1st tenor saxophone, all sax solos
 Stephen "Doc" Kupka – baritone saxophone
 Emilio Castillo – 2nd tenor saxophone, backing vocals (1, 4, 5, 7, 8), lead vocals (3)
 Mic Gillette – trombone, trumpet, backing vocals (1, 4, 5, 7, 8), trumpet solo (11)
 Greg Adams – trumpet, flugelhorn, arrangements (1-4, 6-10), string arrangements and conductor 

Additional musicians
 David Garibaldi – drums (7)
 Carter Collins – congas (7)
 Gerard Vinci – concertmaster 
 Bootche Anderson – backing vocals (1, 2, 9, 20)
 Marilyn Scott – backing vocals (1, 2, 9, 10)
 Pepper Watkins – backing vocals (1, 2, 9, 10)

Charts

Album

Singles

External links
 Tower Of Power-Urban Renewal at Discogs

References

1975 albums
Tower of Power albums
Warner Records albums